IRB Brasil RE, formerly known as the Reinsurance Institute of Brazil (corporate name: IRB Brasil RE) operates in the market for reinsurance.

History
Created in 1939 by Getúlio Vargas, IRB was intended to provide reinsurance to domestic companies through the company itself and its policy of retrocession, where most of the risk was shared between the national insurance companies. It maintained its monopoly until 2007, when, through Complementary Law, Congress reopened the Brazilian reinsurance market, and IRB was classified as a local reinsurer.

Since October 2013, IRB Brasil RE operates as a private company. In addition to the Brazilian Federal Government, the controlling shareholders are BB Seguros Participações S.A., Bradesco Auto Re Companhia de Seguros, Itaú Seguros S.A., Itaú Vida e Previdência S.A. and the Investment Fund on Participations Caixa Barcelona. Together, these controlling shareholders have over 90% of the company's total capital stock.

According to Standard & Poor's in 2005, the IRB was the 64th reinsurance company in the world in volume of awards, with a net revenue of 525.9 million U.S. dollars, and a retrocession of 47.7%.

Scandal of the IRB

Former deputy Roberto Jefferson, an insurance broker and state president Luiz Henrique Brandao Neto Appolonio were accused of corruption related to an allowance of 400,000 charged by the PTB to the real leader of the IRB.

References

External links
 
 

Financial services companies established in 1939
Reinsurance companies
Insurance companies of Brazil
Companies based in Rio de Janeiro (city)